Ibrahim Pasha al-Dalati (also known as Ibrahim Deli Pasha) was the Ottoman governor of Damascus in 1788.

Life
Ibrahim was a Kurdish professional soldier who entered the service of the Azm family, members of which served as the governors of Damascus and surrounding provinces throughout the 18th century. He served a stint as governor of Tripoli but his dismissal was engineered by the Acre-based governor of Sidon, Ahmad Pasha al-Jazzar. 

Ibrahim was appointed governor of Damascus in 1788. After his return from Mecca after leading the annual Hajj caravan that same year, the Janissaries of the Citadel of Damascus and the aghawat of al-Midan revolted against him. He relocated to Hama where he rallied troops with the sanction of the imperial government in Constantinople and marched on Damascus with his mercenary troops, who included Druze from Mount Lebanon. He besieged the citadel, eventually securing the submission of the Janissaries after mediation by the city's religious notables and the Kurdish cavalry stationed in the city led by Mulla Isma'il.

References

Bibliography

Kurdish people from the Ottoman Empire
Ottoman governors of Damascus
18th-century Kurdish people